Álvaro Aguado Méndez (born 1 May 1996) is a Spanish professional footballer who plays as a central midfielder for Real Valladolid.

Career
Born in Jaén, Andalusia, Aguado mainly represented Villarreal CF and Levante UD as a youth. On 27 August 2015, he signed a one-year deal with Tercera División side Ontinyent CF.

Aguado made his senior debut on 15 November 2015, starting in a 4–1 home routing of CF Borriol. The following 26 July he moved to Segunda División B side Real Jaén, club he already represented as a youth.

On 15 July 2017, after suffering relegation, Aguado signed for Córdoba CF and was immediately assigned to the reserves also in the third division. He made his first team debut on 20 December, coming on as a second-half substitute for Carlos Caballero in a 5–0 home thrashing of CF Reus Deportiu in the Segunda División.

Aguado scored his first professional goal on 2 June 2018, netting the last in a 3–0 home defeat of Sporting de Gijón. On 2 October, he extended his contract until 2022.

On 25 January 2019, Aguado signed a four-and-a-half-year contract with La Liga side Real Valladolid, being immediately loaned back to Córdoba until the end of the season. Returning to the Blanquivioletas for the 2019–20 campaign, he made his debut for the club on 18 December by starting and scoring a brace in a 3–0 Copa del Rey away defeat of Tolosa CF.

On 22 January 2020, after making no league appearances for Valladolid, Aguado was loaned to second division side CD Numancia until June. On 1 October, he moved to fellow league team CF Fuenlabrada also in a temporary deal.

References

External links

1996 births
Living people
Spanish footballers
Footballers from Jaén, Spain
Association football midfielders
Segunda División players
Segunda División B players
Tercera División players
Ontinyent CF players
Real Jaén footballers
Córdoba CF B players
Córdoba CF players
Real Valladolid players
CD Numancia players
CF Fuenlabrada footballers